This is a list of television programmes broadcast by the BBC either currently or previously broadcast on the BBC in the United Kingdom.



Current programming
Programmes in this section have been broadcast by the BBC in the last year or have a commission for further episodes.

Recommissioned shows are shown as running to the present, as are any show that is currently airing.

Only channels where an episode first aired are listed (with the exception of episodes on non-BBC Three programmes which debuted online; for these) the linear channel and the transmission date on that channel are used.

Children's television programmes can be found at List of BBC children's television programmes.

Drama

Comedy

Miniseries

Soap

One-off Drama

Unscripted

Documentaries

Gameshows

Reality

News programming
For programmes which only air on the BBC World News Channel, see programming on BBC World News.

Sports Programming
 FA Cup: BBC One/TV 1937 – 1996, 2002 – 2008 & 2014 – present (shared with BT Sport)
 Wimbledon Championships: BBC TV/BBC One 1937 – present, BBC Two 1964 – present
 The Boat Race: BBC TV/One 1938 – 2004 & 2010 – present (ITV covered the Boat Race from 2005 – 2009)
 Live England Test Cricket: BBC TV 1938 – 1998
 Rugby League Challenge Cup: BBC One & Two 1948 – present 
 Summer & Winter Olympic Games: BBC One & Two 1948 – present 
 The Open Championship: BBC One & Two 1955 – present (live coverage 1955 – 2015, highlights 2016 – present)
 Test Match Special: BBC Radio 1957 – present
 Final Score: BBC One 1958 – present (part of Grandstand 1958 – 2001)
 Grandstand: BBC One 1958 – 2007, BBC Two 1981 – 2007
 The Grand National: BBC One 1960 – 2012, BBC Radio 1948 – present (rights transferred to Channel 4)
 Rugby League World Cup: BBC One & Two 1960 – present (live coverage 1960 – 2000 & 2013 – present, highlights only 2008)
 UEFA European Championship: BBC One 1960 – present (shared with ITV Sport)
 FIFA World Cup: BBC One 1962 – present (shared with ITV Sport)
 Match of the Day: BBC Two 1964 – 1966, BBC One 1966 – present (Only on air for FA Cup weekends 1988 – 1992 & 2001 – 2004)
 Rugby Special: BBC Two 1966 – 2005 & 2016 – present
 Sportsnight: BBC One 1968 – 1997
 Football Focus: BBC One 1974 – present (part of Grandstand 1974 – 2001)
 The Grand Prix: BBC One & BBC Two 1976 – 1996; BBC Three 2009 – 2015 (Rebroadcast between 2009 – 2015 on BBC Red Button and BBC iPlayer)
 Formula 1: BBC One, BBC Two & BBC Three 1976 – 1996 & 2009 – 2015 (rights transferred to Channel 4)
 World Snooker Championship: BBC One & BBC Two 1977 – present
 BDO World Darts Championship: BBC One & BBC Two 1978 – 2016
 Ski Sunday: BBC Two 1978 – present
 London Marathon: BBC One 1981 – present
 Great North Run: BBC One 1981 – present
 Today at Wimbledon: BBC Two 1993 – 2014 & 2016 – present (replaced by Wimbledon 2Day in 2015)
 6 Nations Rugby: BBC One 2000 – present (shared with ITV Sport 2016 – present)
 Match of the Day 2: BBC Two 2004 – 2012, BBC One 2012 – present
 FIFA Club World Cup: 2005, 2012, 2019 – present
 FIFA Women's World Cup – BBC One/Two 2007 – present
 Super Bowl (BBC One Two 2007 – 2013 & 2016 – 2022)
 ATP World Tour Finals – BBC Two 2009 – present
 Football League/League Cup Show: BBC One 2009 – 2015 (rights transferred to Channel 5)
 PDC Champions League of Darts: BBC One & BBC Two 2016 – present
 The Premier League Show: BBC Two 2016 – present
 England Test Match, ODI & T20 International Highlights: 2020 – present
 2 England Men's T20 Internationals & 2 England Women's T20 International: 2020 – present
 10 matches from men's City based T20 competition & 8 matches from women's City based T20 competition: 2020 – present
 UEFA Women's Championship 2022 – present

Events
 Chelsea Flower Show
 Children in Need (BBC One & BBC Two 1980 – present)
 Comic Relief (BBC One & BBC Two 1985 – present)
 Edinburgh Festival
 Eurovision Song Contest (Finals: BBC TV/BBC One 1956 – present, Semi-finals: BBC Three 2004 – 2015; 2022, BBC Four 2016 – 2021, BBC One 2023–present)
 Glastonbury Festival (BBC Two 1997 – present, BBC Three 2003 – 2015, BBC Four 2003 – present)
 Junior Eurovision Song Contest (BBC One & CBBC 2022–present)
 The Proms
 Sport Relief: (BBC One & BBC Two 2002 – present)

Former programming

0–9

A

 The A to Z of TV Gardening
 The ABC Murders (BBC One 2018)
 Absolute Power (BBC Radio 4 2000 – 2004, BBC Two 2004)
 Absolutely Fabulous (BBC One 1992 – 1996, 2001 – 2004 & 2011 – 2012)
 Accidents Can Happen (BBC One 2004 – 2006)
 Accused (BBC One 2010 – 2012)
 Adam Adamant Lives! (BBC One 1966 – 1967)
 Ads Infinitum (BBC Two 1996, 1998–2000)
 The Adventure Game (BBC One 1980 – 1982, BBC Two 1981 – 1986)
 An Adventure in Space and Time (BBC Two November 2013)
 Afghanistan: The Great Game – A Personal View by Rory Stewart (BBC One 2012)
 Africa (BBC One 2013)
 After You've Gone (BBC One 2007 – 2008)
 Against the Law (BBC Two 2017) 
 Age Before Beauty (BBC One 2018)
 Alan Davies Après-Ski (BBC Two 2014)
 Alaska: Earth's Frozen Kingdom (a.k.a. Wild Alaska, BBC Two 2015)
 All About Me (BBC One 2002 – 2004)
 All Along the Watchtower (BBC One 1999)
 'Allo 'Allo! (BBC One 1982 – 1992, BBC Two 2007)
 All Round to Mrs. Brown's (BBC One 2017 – 2020)
 Alvin and the Chipmunks
 The Alvin Show
 The Amazing Mrs Pritchard (BBC One 2006)
 Amazon Abyss (BBC Two 2005 and 2009)
 Ambassadors (BBC Two 2013)
 Amber (BBC Four 2014)
 American Dad (BBC Two 2005 – 2006, BBC Three 2007 – 2016)
 The American Future: A History (BBC Two 2008)
 And Then There Were None (BBC One 2015)
 Andy Pandy (BBC One 1950 – 1970, CBeebies 2002)
 Angels (BBC One 1975 – 1983)
 Andes to Amazon (a.k.a. Wild South America, BBC Two 2000)
 Andrew Marr's History of Modern Britain (BBC Two 2007)
 Andrew Marr's History of the World (BBC One 2012)
 Animal Antics (BBC One 2012)
 Animal Babies (BBC One 2016)
 Animal Hospital (BBC One 1994 – 2004)
 Animal Park (BBC One & BBC Two 2000 – 2009)
 Animals with Cameras (BBC One 2018)
 Anthea Turner: Perfect Housewife (BBC Three 2006 – 2007)
 Any Dream Will Do (BBC One 2007)
 Apparitions (BBC One 2008)
 Apple Tree Yard (BBC One 22 January 2017 – 6 February 2017)
 Archangel (BBC One 2005)
 Are You Being Served? (BBC One 1972 – 1985 & 2016)
 Are You an Egghead? (BBC Two 2008 – 2009)
 Are You Fitter Than a Pensioner? (BBC Three 2010)
 Around the World in 80 Treasures (BBC Two 2005)
 Arrested Development 
 Arrow to the Heart (BBC 1952 – 1956)
 Arthur (CBBC 2002 – present)
 As Seen on TV (BBC One 2009)
 As Time Goes By (BBC One 1992 – 2002 & 2005)
 The Ascent of Man
 Ashes to Ashes (BBC One 2008 – 2010)
 Asia Business Report
 Asia Today
 Ask Rhod Gilbert (BBC One 2010 – 2011)
 Asylum (BBC Four 2015)
 Atlantic: The Wildest Ocean on Earth (BBC Two 2015)
 Atlantis (BBC One 2013 – 2015)
 Attenborough: 60 Years in the Wild (BBC Two 2012)
 Auf Wiedersehen, Pet (ITV 1983 – 1986, BBC One 2002 – 2004)

B

 Babs (BBC One 2017)
 The Baby Borrowers (BBC Three 2007)
 The Baby Borrowers USA
 Backchat (BBC Three 2013 – 2014, BBC Two 2014 – 26 December 2015)
 Back to the Floor (BBC Two 1997 – 2002)
 Bad Education (BBC Three 2012 – 2014)
 Badults (BBC Three 23 July 2013 – 7 July 2014)
 Bagpuss (BBC One 1974)
 The Baker Street Boys (BBC 1983)
 Balamory (BBC Two 2002 – 2005)
 Ballykissangel (BBC One 1996 – 2001)
 Bake Off: Crème de la Crème (BBC Two 29 March 2016 – 31 May 2017, moved to Channel 4 after two series)
 Band of Brothers (BBC Two 2001)
 Bang Bang, It's Reeves and Mortimer (BBC Two 1999)
 Bang Goes the Theory (BBC One 2009 – 5 May 2014)
 Banished (BBC Two 2015)
 The Barchester Chronicles (BBC One 1982)
 BBC World News (BBC World Television Service 1990 – 1995, BBC World 1995 – 2008, BBC One / BBC News Channel 1997 – present, BBC America 2007 – 2009, BBC Two 1997 – 2015) 
 BBC World News America
 Bear Behaving Badly (BBC One 2007 – 2008, CBBC 2008 – 2010)
 The Bear Family and Me (BBC Two 2011)
 Beat the Brain (BBC Two 2015)
 Beau Geste (BBC One 1982)
 Beautiful People (BBC Two 2008 – 2009)
 Becoming Human (BBC Three 2011)
 Being Human (BBC Three 2008 – 2013)
 Bella and the Boys (BBC Two 2004)
 Bellamy's People (BBC Two 2010)
 Belonging
 Berkeley Square (BBC 1998)
 Better Things  (BBC Two 2019 – 2022)
 Between the Lines (BBC One 1992 – 1994)
 The Big Allotment Challenge (BBC Two 2014)
 Big Break (BBC One 1991 – 2002)
 Big Cats (BBC One 2018)
 Big Deal (BBC One 1984 – 1986)
 The Big Read (BBC 2003)
 Big School (BBC One 2013 – 2014)
 Big Ticket (BBC One 1998)
 The Big Trip (BBC Two 1994 – 1995)
 The Bigger Picture with Graham Norton (BBC One 2005 – 2006)
 Bill Oddie Back in the USA (BBC Two 2007)
 The Billion Dollar Chicken Shop (BBC One 2015)
 Birds of a Feather (BBC One 1989 – 1998, ITV 2014 – 2017)
 Birdsong (BBC One 2012)
 Bizarre Animal ER (BBC Three 2009)
 Bizarre ER (BBC Three 2008 – 2011)
 The Black and White Minstrel Show (BBC One 1958 – 1978)
 Black Earth Rising (BBC Two 2018)
 Blackadder (BBC One 1983 – 1989)
 Blackpool (BBC One 2004 – 2006)
 Blake's 7 (BBC One 1978 – 1981)
 Blandings (BBC One 13 January 2013 – 30 March 2014)
 Blankety Blank (BBC One 1979 – 1990 & 1997 – 1999, ITV 2001 – 2003 & 2016)
 Bleak House (BBC One 2005)
 The Bleak Old Shop of Stuff (BBC Two 19 December 2011 – 5 March 2012)
 Blessed (BBC One 2005)
 Blott on the Landscape
 The Blue Planet (BBC One 2001)
 Blue Planet II (BBC One 2017)
 Bluestone 42 (BBC Three 2013 – 2015)
 Boats that Built Britain (BBC Four 2010)
 Bob the Builder (1999 TV series)
 Bob's Full House (BBC One 1984 – 2000)
 The Book Quiz (BBC Four 2007 – 2008)
 Bonekickers (BBC One 2008)
 Boomers (BBC One 15 August 2014 – 29 April 2016)
 Bottom (BBC Two 1991 – 1995)
 The Boys from Baghdad High (BBC Two 2008)
 Boy Meets Girl (BBC Two 3 September 2015 – 4 August 2016)
 Boys from the Blackstuff (BBC Two 1980 – 1982)
 The Boy With The Topknot (BBC Two 2017)
 Breakaway (BBC Two 2012, BBC One 2013)
 Brian Pern (BBC Four 10 February 2014 – 29 March 2017)
 Britain and the Sea (BBC One 2013)
 Britain from Above (BBC Two 2008)
 Britain Unzipped (BBC Three 2012 – 2013)
 Britain's Great War (BBC One 2014)
 Britain's Lost Routes with Griff Rhys Jones (BBC One 2012)
 Britain's Missing Top Model (BBC Three 2008)
 The British at Work (BBC Two 2011)
 The Brits Who Built the Modern World (BBC Four 2014)
 The Brittas Empire (BBC One 1991 – 1997)
 Broken (BBC One 23 May 2017 – 4 July 2017)
 The Bubble (BBC Two 2010)
 Bucket (BBC Four 2017)
 Bugs (BBC One 1995 – 1999)
 Bumps (TV series) (BBC One 21 February 2020)
 Burn Up (BBC Two 2008)
 By Any Means (BBC Two 2008 – 2011)
 By Any Means (BBC One 2013)

C

 The C-Word (BBC One 2015)
 Café Continental (BBC 1947 – 1953)
 Le Cafe des Reves
 Cambridge Spies (BBC One 2003)
 Candy Cabs (BBC One 5 April 2011 – 19 April 2011)
 Canned Carrott (BBC One 1990 – 1992)
 The Canterbury Tales (BBC One 2003)
 Can't Touch This (BBC One 26 March 2016 – 8 October 2016)
 Carrott Confidential
 Carrott's Lib (BBC One 1982 – 1983)
 Casanova (BBC Two 1971)
 Casanova (BBC Three 2005)
 Case Histories (BBC One 5 June 2011 – 2 June 2013)
 Cash in the Attic (BBC One 2002 – 2013)
 The Casual Vacancy (BBC One 2015, also shown on HBO)
 Catchpoint (BBC Two 2019 – present)
 Catchword (BBC Two 1988 – 1995)
 The Catherine Tate Show (BBC Two 2004 – 2007, BBC One 2009 & 2013)
 Cathy Come Home (BBC One 1966)
 Cats' Eyes (BBC Two 1994)
 CCTV (BBC Three 2003)
 Celebdaq (BBC Three 2003 – 2004)
 Celebrity Big Brother (BBC One & Channel 4 2001 in aid of Comic Relief, subsequent series on Channel 4 & Channel 5)
 Challenge Anneka (BBC One 1987 – 1995, ITV 2006 – 2007)
 Chandler & Co (BBC One 1994 – 1995)
 Changing Rooms (BBC One 1996 – 2004)
 Charlie Brooker's 2016 Wipe (BBC Four 4 January 2011 – 3 January 2012, BBC Two 2 January 2013 – 2 January 2017) Name changes each year to reflect the year reviewed
 Chef! (BBC One 1993 – 1996) 
 The Child In Time (BBC One 24 September 2017)
 Children of the North (BBC Two 1991)
 Children's TV on Trial (BBC Four 26 – 31 May 2007)
 The Chinese Detective (BBC One 1981 – 1982)
 Chinese New Year: The Biggest Celebration on Earth (BBC Two 2016)
 Chivalry and Betrayal: The Hundred Years' War (BBC Four 2013)
 The Choir (BBC Two 4 December 2006 – 28 December 2015)
 ChuckleVision (BBC One 1987 – 2011, CBBC 2002 – 2011)
 Chuggington (BBC Two 2008 – 2012)
 Cilla
 Citizen Khan (BBC One 27 August 2012 – 23 December 2016)
 The City and The City (BBC Two 6 – 27 April 2018)
 City Central (32 episodes from 1998 – 2000)
 City in the Sky (BBC Two 2016)
 Civilisation (BBC Two 1969)
 Class (BBC Three 22 October 2016 – 3 December 2016)
 Clifford the Big Red Dog (BBC One & Cbeebies 2000 – 2003)
 Clifford's Puppy Days
 Clique (BBC Three 5 March 2017 – 9 April 2017)
 Clocking Off (BBC One 2000 – 2003)
 Close to the Enemy (BBC Two 10 November 2016 – 22 December 2016)
 Coast (BBC Two 2005 – 13 August 2015)
 The Colbys
 Colditz (BBC One 1972 – 1974)
 Collateral (BBC Two 12 February 2018 – 5 March 2018)
 Come and Have a Go If You Think You're Smart Enough (BBC One 2004 – 2005)
 Come Back Mrs. Noah (BBC One 1977 – 1978)
 Come Fly with Me (BBC Choice 2000 – 2002)
 Come Fly with Me (BBC One 2010 – 2011)
 Come Home (BBC One 27 March 2018 – 10 April 2018)
 Come Outside (BBC Two 1993 – 1997)
 Comedy Playhouse (BBC One 1961 – 1975 & 2014)
 Coming of Age (BBC Three 2007 – 2011)
 Common As Muck (BBC One 1994 – 1997)
 Commonwealth Jazz Club (1965)
 Congo (BBC Two 2001)
 Connections
 The Coroner (BBC One 16 November 2015 – 2 December 2016)
 Count Arthur Strong (BBC Two 2013, BBC One 2015 – 2017) 
 Coupling (BBC Two 2000 – 2003, BBC Three 2004)
 Cowboy Trap (BBC One 2009 – 2013, also shown on TV3 Ireland)
 Crackerjack (BBC One 1955 – 1984)
 Cradle to Grave (BBC Two 2015)
 The Crane Gang (BBC Two 2013)
 The Creatives (BBC Two 1998 – 2000)
 Crime Traveller (BBC One 1997)
 Crimes of Passion (BBC Four 2014)
 Crimewatch (BBC One 1984 – 2017)
 Crims (BBC Three 2015)
 The Crimson Field (BBC One 2014)
 Crocodile Shoes (BBC One 1994)
 Crooked House (BBC Four 2008)
 Cruise of the Gods (BBC Two 2002)
 The Cry (BBC One 2018)
 Cuckoo (BBC Three 2012 – 2019)
 Cuffs (BBC One 2015)
 Cunk on Christmas (BBC One 29 December 2016)
 Cunk on Britain (BBC Two April 2018)
 The Cut (BBC Two 2009 – 2010)
 Cutting It (BBC One 2002 – 2005)

D

 Da Dick and Dom Dairies (2009)
 Dad (BBC One 1997 – 1999)
 Deer Squad (BBC Two 2010)
 Daily Politics (BBC Two 2003 – 2018)
 Dallas (BBC One 1979 – 1991, 1996 & 1998, revival aired on Channel 5)
 Dalziel and Pascoe (BBC One 1996 – 2007)
 Damages
 Damilola, Our Loved Boy (BBC One 7 November 2016)
 Dancing on the Edge (BBC Two 4 February 2013 – 10 March 2013)
 Dangerfield (BBC One 1995 – 1999)
 Danger Mouse (ITV 1981 – 1992, CBBC 28 September 2015 – 30 October 2016)
 Dangerous Knowledge
 Daniel Deronda (BBC One 2002)
 Danny and the Human Zoo (BBC One 31 August 2015)
 The Dark: Nature's Nighttime World (BBC Two 2012)
 Dark Money (BBC One 2019)
 The Dark Side of Fame with Piers Morgan (BBC One 2008)
 Dark Towers (BBC Two 1981)
 Dastardly and Muttley in Their Flying Machines
 Dave Allen at Peace (BBC Two 2 April 2018)
 Davina (BBC One 2006)
 The Day Today (BBC Two 1994)
 The Day the Universe Changed (BBC One 1985)
 A Day with Dana (BBC Two 1974 – 1975)
 Dead Gorgeous (CBBC 2010)
 Dead Ringers (BBC Radio 4 2002 – present & BBC Two 2002 – 2007)
 The Dead Room (BBC Four 2018)
 Deadly 60 (BBC One & BBC Two 2010 – 2012, CBBC 2009 – 2012)
 Dear Ladies (BBC Two 1983–1985)
 Death and Nightingales (BBC Two 2018)
 Death Comes to Pemberley (BBC One 2013)
 The Death of Yugoslavia (BBC One 1995)
 Death Unexplained (BBC One 2012)
 Decidedly Dusty
 Decline and Fall (BBC One 31 March 2017 – 14 April 2017)
 DEF II (Strand on BBC Two 1988 – 1994)
 Defending the Guilty (BBC Two 2018 – 2019)
 Degrassi
 Desperate Romantics (BBC Two 2009)
 Detectorists (BBC Four 2014 – 2017)
 Diagnosis: Murder (now on Channel 5)
 Diana and I (BBC Two 4 September 2017)
 Dick & Dom in da Bungalow (2002–2006)
 Dickensian (BBC One 2015 – 2016)
 Diddy TV (CBBC 2016 – present)
 Didn't They Do Well (BBC One 2004)
 dinnerladies (BBC One 1998 – 2000)
 Disney Time
 The Disorderly Room (BBC TV 1937 – 1939)
 Dixon of Dock Green (BBC One 1955 – 1976)
 Doctor Who Confidential (BBC Three 2005 – 2011)
 Doctor Who Extra (BBC iPlayer 2014 – 2015)
 Doing Money (BBC Two 2018)
 Dolphins - Spy in the Pod (BBC One 2014)
 Don't Forget the Driver (BBC Two 2019)
 Don't Scare the Hare (BBC One 2011)
 Don't Tell the Bride (BBC Three 2007 – 2014, BBC One 2015, Sky1 2016, E4 2017 – present)
 Doomwatch (BBC One 1970 – 1972)
 Down to Earth (BBC One 2000 – 2005)
 Dragons Alive (BBC One 2004)
 Dreamspaces (BBC Three 2003 – 2004)
 The Driver (BBC One 2014)
 Dry Your Eyes (BBC One Northern Ireland 2006 – 2007)
 Dusty Springfield at the BBC
 Dynasties (BBC One, 11 November 2018 – 9 November 2018)
 Dynasty

E

 Earth: The Power of the Planet (BBC Two 2007)
 Earth's Greatest Spectacles (a.k.a. Seasonal Wonderlands, BBC Two 2016)
 Earth's Natural Wonders (BBC One 2015 – 2018)
 Earth's Seasonal Secrets (a.k.a. Earth's Great Seasons, BBC One 2016 – 2017)
 Earth's Wildest Waters: The Big Fish (a.k.a. The Big Catch, BBC Two 2015)
 Earthflight (BBC One 2011)
 EastEnders: E20 (BBC Online & BBC Three 2010 – 2011)
 EastEnders Revealed (BBC Choice 1998 – 2003, BBC Three 2003 – 1 January 2016)
 The Edge (BBC One 2015, BBC Two 2015)
 Edge of Darkness (BBC Two 1985)
 Edwardian Farm (BBC Two 2010 – 2011)
 Eldorado (BBC One 1992 – 1993)
 Electric Dreams (BBC Four 2009)
 Emma Goes to Bollywood (BBC Two 2005)
 Empire (BBC One 2012)
 Enterprice (BBC Three 2018 – 2020)
 Epic Win (BBC One 2011)
 Eric, Ernie and Me (BBC Four 2017)
 The Escape Artist (BBC One 2013)
 The European Union: In or Out (BBC Two 2014)
 Eurovision: Your Country Needs Blue (BBC One 2011)
 Eurovision: Your Country Needs You
 Excalibur (BBC One 1974 – 1975)
 Exile (BBC One 2011)
 Extras (BBC Two 2005 – 2006, BBC One 2007)

F

G

H

I

J

K

L

M

N

O

P

Q

R

S

T

U

V

W

X

Y

Z

See also

 List of programs broadcast by BBC America
 List of programs broadcast by BBC Canada
 BBC television drama
 List of television programmes
 List of animated television series
 List of British TV shows remade for the American market
 List of BBC children's television programmes
 List of BBC sitcoms
 List of comedy television series
 List of international game shows
 List of science fiction television programs
 List of television spin-offs

Notes

References

External links
 BBC programmes

BBC
BBC
Television programmes